Buhloone Mindstate (stylized as Buhlo͞one Mind State on the album cover) is the third studio album by American hip hop group De La Soul. It was released on September 21, 1993, through Tommy Boy Records, and was the group's last record to be produced with Prince Paul.

Title 
Buhloone is a phonetic spelling of the English noun "balloon". This theme is laid out in the intro track, which starts with the sound of a balloon being inflated;  then the hookline "it might blow up, but it won't go pop" is repeated over and over, until the sound of a balloon popping replaces the final word "pop".

Songs and guests 
De La Soul continued its early- to mid-1990s experimentations with jazz by featuring jazz veterans Maceo Parker, Fred Wesley, and Pee Wee Ellis, on "Patti Dooke" and "I Am I Be". The song "Patti Dooke" deals with what the group sees as the mainstream's efforts to control the direction of black music.  Posdnous raps:

I'm known as the farmer
Cultivatin' mate without mendin'
Bendin', compromising any of my styles to gain a smile
Listen while you hear it
There's no pink in my slip
I reckon that the rhythm and the blues in the rap got me red
While the boys from Tommy playing bridge crossin' to a larger community
Yet they're soon to see I have a brother named Luck

The Japanese rappers Scha Dara Parr and Takagi Kan make an appearance on "Long Island Wildin'" while Biz Markie appears on "Stone Age" and Guru does the spoken chorus of "Patti Dooke". Dres of Black Sheep appears on "En Focus", and the album heavily features Shortie No Mass. The album was preceded by the single and video "Breakadawn", which features samples from Michael Jackson's "I Can't Help It" and Smokey Robinson's "Quiet Storm".

Critical reception 

At the end of 1993, Buhloone Mindstate was voted the eighth best album of the year in the Pazz & Jop, an annual poll of American critics nationwide, published by The Village Voice. Robert Christgau, the poll's creator and supervisor, ranked it fifth best on his own year-end list. In a contemporary review, Rolling Stone critic Paul Evans said the record was more focused than De La Soul's previous albums and also more ambitious sonically: "Musically, Buhloone Mind State raises the stakes; it gets to something rap seldom achieves — a truly gorgeous groove." In 2005, comedian Chris Rock named it the 10th greatest hip hop record of all time in a list published by Rolling Stone.

Track listing

Charts

References 

1993 albums
De La Soul albums
Tommy Boy Records albums